Joe Henderson (April 24, 1937 – June 30, 2001) was an American jazz tenor saxophonist. In a career spanning more than four decades, Henderson played with many of the leading American players of his day and recorded for several prominent labels, including Blue Note, Milestone, and Verve.

Biography

Early life
Born in Lima, Ohio, United States, Henderson was one of fourteen children. He was encouraged by his parents Dennis and Irene (née Farley) and older brother James T. to study music. He dedicated his first album to them "for being so understanding and tolerant" during his formative years. Early musical interests included drums, piano, saxophone and composition. According to Kenny Dorham, two local piano teachers who went to school with Henderson's brothers and sisters, Richard Patterson and Don Hurless, gave him a knowledge of the piano. He was particularly enamored of his brother's record collection. It seems that a hometown drummer, John Jarette, advised Henderson to listen to musicians like Lester Young, Stan Getz, Dexter Gordon and Charlie Parker. He also liked Flip Phillips, Lee Konitz and the Jazz at the Philharmonic recordings. However, Parker became his greatest inspiration. His first approach to the saxophone was under the tutelage of Herbert Murphy in high school. In this period of time, he wrote several scores for the school band.

By age 18, Henderson was active on the Detroit jazz scene of the mid-1950s, playing in jam sessions with visiting New York City stars. While attending classes of flute and bass at Wayne State University, he further developed his saxophone and compositional skills under the guidance of renowned teacher Larry Teal at the Teal School of Music. In late 1959, he formed his first group. By the time he arrived at Wayne State University, he had transcribed and memorized so many Lester Young solos that his professors believed he had perfect pitch. Henderson's college classmates included Yusef Lateef, Barry Harris and Donald Byrd. He also studied music at Kentucky State College.

Shortly prior to his army induction in 1960, Henderson was commissioned by UNAC to write some arrangements for the suite "Swings and Strings", which was later performed by a ten-member orchestra and the local dance band of Jimmy Wilkins.

Early career
Henderson spent two years (1960–62) in the U.S. Army: first in Fort Benning, where he competed in an Army talent show and won first place, then in Fort Belvoir, where he was chosen for a world tour, with a show to entertain soldiers. While in Paris, he met Kenny Drew and Kenny Clarke. Then he was sent to Maryland to conclude his enlistment. In 1962, he was finally discharged and promptly moved to New York. He first met trumpeter Kenny Dorham, an invaluable guidance for him, at saxophonist Junior Cook's place. That very evening, they went to see Dexter Gordon playing at Birdland. Henderson was asked by Gordon himself to play something with his rhythm section; he happily accepted.

Although Henderson's earliest recordings were marked by a strong hard-bop influence, his playing encompassed not only the bebop tradition, but R&B, Latin and avant-garde as well. He soon joined Horace Silver's band, and provided a seminal solo on the jukebox hit "Song for My Father". After leaving Silver's band in 1966, Henderson resumed freelancing and also co-led a big band with Dorham. His arrangements for the band went unrecorded until the release of Joe Henderson Big Band (Verve) in 1996.

Blue Note recordings
From 1963 to 1968, Henderson appeared on nearly 30 albums for Blue Note, including five released under his name. The recordings ranged from relatively conservative hard-bop sessions (Page One, 1963) to more explorative sessions (Inner Urge and Mode for Joe, 1966). He played a prominent role in many landmark albums under other leaders for the label, including most of Horace Silver's Song for My Father, Herbie Hancock's The Prisoner, Lee Morgan's The Sidewinder and "out" albums with pianist Andrew Hill (Black Fire, 1963 and Point of Departure, 1964) and drummer Pete La Roca (Basra, 1965).

In 1967, there was a brief association with Miles Davis's quintet featuring Herbie Hancock, Wayne Shorter, Ron Carter and Tony Williams, although the band was never recorded. Henderson's adaptability and eclecticism would become even more apparent in the years to follow.

Milestone Records recordings
Signing with Orrin Keepnews's fledgling Milestone label in 1967 marked a new phase in Henderson's career. He co-led the Jazz Communicators with Freddie Hubbard from 1967 to 1968. Henderson was also featured on Hancock's Fat Albert Rotunda for Warner Bros. It was during this time that Henderson began to experiment with jazz-funk fusion, studio overdubbing, and other electronic effects. Song and album titles such as Power to the People, In Pursuit of Blackness, and Black Narcissus reflected his growing political awareness and social consciousness, although Black Narcissus was named after the 1947 Powell and Pressburger film of the same title.

After a brief association with Blood, Sweat & Tears in 1971, Henderson moved to San Francisco. He was still signed to Milestone Records, which had recently moved to San Francisco after being acquired by Fantasy Records. Henderson wanted to be near his label, and get out of New York City. Henderson lived in San Francisco for the rest of his life, and taught at the San Francisco Conservatory of Music from 1978-1982, according to musicologist Joel Geoffrey Harris.  A performance space at the San Francisco Jazz Center is named for him.

Later career and death
Though he occasionally worked with Echoes of an Era, the Griffith Park Band and Chick Corea, Henderson remained primarily a leader throughout the 1980s. An accomplished and prolific composer, he began to focus more on reinterpreting standards and his own earlier compositions.  Blue Note attempted to position the artist at the forefront of a resurgent jazz scene in 1986 with the release of the two-volume State of the Tenor recorded at the Village Vanguard in New York City. The albums (with Ron Carter on bass and Al Foster on drums) revisited the tenor trio form used by Sonny Rollins in 1957 on his own live Vanguard albums for the same label. Henderson established his basic repertoire for the next seven or eight years, with Thelonious Monk's "Ask Me Now" becoming a signature ballad feature. Following his brief return to Blue Note Records, Henderson was signed by the Italian label Red Records, for which he recorded two more albums in the piano-less trio format.

In 1991, Verve records signed Henderson to the label. In January of that year, Henderson had made a guest appearance on Stephen Scott's Verve album Something to Consider, and worked with Verve producer and vice president Richard Seidel during the session. Henderson and Seidel had first worked together in 1979 while making Henderson's Relaxin' at Camarillo album. After Verve expressed interest in signing Henderson, the saxophonist had to quickly complete his existing contract with Red Records, which he did by recording The Standard Joe in March 1991. Seidel said in a 2016 interview with musicologist Joel Geoffrey Harris that he decided to offer Henderson a record deal after hearing him perform live at Fat Tuesdays in New York. Seidel served as producer on all five of Henderson's 1990s Verve studio albums. Verve adopted a 'songbook' approach to recording him, coupling it with a considerable marketing and publicity campaign, which more successfully positioned Henderson at the forefront of the contemporary jazz scene. His 1992 'comeback' album Lush Life: The Music of Billy Strayhorn was a commercial and critical success and was followed by tribute albums to Miles Davis, Antonio Carlos Jobim, a big band album, and a jazz adaptation of the George Gershwin opera Porgy and Bess.

A chain smoker, on June 30, 2001, after a long battle with emphysema, Henderson died, in San Francisco, California, as a result of heart failure. He was 64 years of age.

Discography

References

External links
The Joe Henderson Discography
Joe Henderson Discography & Chronology. Retrieved November 25, 2012
Twelve Essential Joe Henderson Tracks by S. Victor Aaron 

1937 births
2001 deaths
American jazz composers
American male jazz composers
African-American saxophonists
American jazz tenor saxophonists
American male saxophonists
Soul-jazz saxophonists
Hard bop saxophonists
Mainstream jazz saxophonists
Jazz fusion saxophonists
Post-bop saxophonists
Grammy Award winners
Wayne State University alumni
People from Lima, Ohio
Blue Note Records artists
Enja Records artists
Red Records artists
Milestone Records artists
Blood, Sweat & Tears members
20th-century American saxophonists
Bebop saxophonists
20th-century American composers
Jazz musicians from Ohio
20th-century American male musicians
20th-century jazz composers
CTI Records artists
20th-century African-American musicians